Singl ploče (1976–1980) (trans. 7-inch singles (1976–1980)) is a compilation album by Yugoslav rock band Bijelo Dugme, released in 1982.

Background
In early 1982, Bijelo Dugme performed in Innsbruck, Austria, at a manifestation conceptualized as a symbolic passing of the torch whereby the Winter Olympic Games last host city (Innsbruck) makes a handover to the next one (Sarajevo). On their return to Yugoslavia, the band's equipment was seized by the customs, as it was discovered that they had put new equipment into old boxes. The band's record label, Jugoton decided to lend 150,000,000 Yugoslav dinars to Bijelo Dugme, in order to pay the penalty. In order to regain part of the money as soon as possible, Jugoton decided to release two compilation albums, Singl ploče (1974-1975) and Singl ploče (1976-1980).

Track listing

Personnel
Željko Bebek - vocals
Goran Bregović - guitar, producer (tracks: 3, 4, 11)
Zoran Redžić - bass guitar, producer (track 7)
Milić Vukašinović - drums (tracks: 1, 5, 6, 7)
Ipe Ivandić - drums (tracks: 4, 8, 9, 10, 12)
Điđi Jankelić - drums (tracks: 2, 3, 8, 10, 11)
Laza Ristovski - keyboards (tracks: 2, 4, 5, 6, 7)
Vlado Pravdić - keyboards (tracks: 1, 3, 8, 9, 10, 11, 12)

Additional personnel
Neil Harrison - producer (tracks: 1, 5, 6, 7, 12)
Zlatko Hold - producer (tracks: 9, 10)
Vladimir Mihaljek - producer (track 2)
Miro Bevc - recorded by (tracks: 2, 8, 10)
Rade Ercegovac - recorded by (tracks: 6, 11, 12)
Pete Henderson - recorded by (tracks: 1, 6)
Gus Mossler - recorded by (tracks: 3, 4)
Nick Glennie-Smith - recorded by (tracks: 7, 12)
Jon Kelly - recorded by (track 5)
Branko Podbrežnički - recorded by (track 8)
Tahir Durkalić - recorded by (track 8)
Siniša Škarica - compiled by
Goran Trbuljak - artwork (design)
Vladan Jovanović - artwork (drawing)

References

Singl ploče (1976–1980) at Discogs

External links
Singl ploče (1976–1980) at Discogs

Bijelo Dugme compilation albums
1982 compilation albums
Jugoton compilation albums

hr:Singl ploče (1976-1980)